The Ceram mangrove monitor (Varanus cerambonensis) is a species of monitor lizards found in Indonesia. Specifically, it is found on some of the central Moluccan Islands including: Ambon, Seram, Obi, Buru, and Banda. On Ambon and probably on New Guinea V. cerambonensis occurs sympatrically with Varanus indicus. It is in the indicus species group of the subgenus Euprepiosaurus.

Description
Its nostrils are situated nearer to tip of its long snout than to its eyes. Its tail is compressed with a double keel on top and is quite prehensile. They are very adept at swimming however they are more  closer related to tree monitors as they are known to be found within low-lying rainforests, often in close proximity to streams. The dorsal ground coloration Appears dark Blue to black, with many scattered large and small yellow spots, which are arranged to form cross bands. The belly is yellowish-white. The tongue color is dark from a distance but light up close. They are very wary of people and are not commonly kept as pets. Field observations of
V. cerambonensis have been scarce, and little has been published on its
natural history and occurrence.

References

Further reading 
 Varanidae.org
 Ast, Jennifer C. (2001). Mitochondrial DNA Evidence and Evolution in Varanoidea (Squamata). Cladistics 17 (3): 211-226 [erratum in 18 (1):125]
 Philipp, K. M., W. Böhme & T. Ziegler (1999). The identity of Varanus indicus: Redefinition and description of a sibling species coexisting at the type locality (Sauria: Varanidae: Varanus indicus group). Spixiana 22 (3): 273-287
 Philipp,K.M.; Ziegler, T. & Böhme, W. (2007). Preliminary Investigations of the Natural Diet of Six Monitor Lizard Species of the Varanus (Euprepiosaurus) indicus Group. Mertensiella 16: 336-345
 Koch A, Arida E, Schmitz A, Böhme W, Ziegler T. (2009). Refining the polytypic species concept of mangrove monitors (Squamata: Varanus indicus group): a new cryptic species from the Talaud Islands, Indonesia, reveals the underestimated diversity of Indo-Australian monitor lizards. Australian Journal of Zoology 57(1): 29-40
 Ziegler, Thomas; Wolfgang Böhme, Andreas Schmitz (2007). A new species of the Varanus indicus group (Squamata, Varanidae) from Halmahera Island, Moluccas: morphological and molecular evidence. Mitteilungen aus dem Museum für Naturkunde in Berlin 83 (S1): 109-119
 Ziegler, T., Schmitz, A., Koch, A. & W. Böhme (2007). A review of the subgenus Euprepiosaurus of Varanus (Squamata: Varanidae): morphological and molecular phylogeny, distribution and zoogeography, with an identification key for the members of the V. indicus and the V. prasinus species groups. Zootaxa 1472: 1-28

Varanus
Reptiles of Indonesia
Reptiles described in 1999